Ivoryline is an American Christian rock band from Tyler, Texas, formerly signed to Tooth & Nail Records.

History
Ivoryline formed in 2003 under the name Dead End Driveway, releasing an EP and an album under this name before changing the name to Ivoryline in 2005. Soon after the name change, the band was selected to play at the 2006 Vans Warped Tour. While on the tour, they were scouted by Tooth & Nail Records, who signed them in 2007 and released their debut full-length, There Came a Lion, in February 2008. The album hit No. 25 on the Billboard Top Christian Albums chart and No. 15 on the Top Heatseekers Chart.

The group toured with Automatic Loveletter in July 2008. In the fall of that year, Ivoryline toured with Family Force 5 and The Maine, before they embarked on their first headlining tour (called "There Came a Tour") with There For Tomorrow, In:Aviate, and The Lives of Famous Men. The band is currently a four-piece and working on new material.

In February 2009, they premiered their music video for "Days End" on AbsolutePunk.net—the video, filmed in mid-2008, includes their former guitarist and then was featured on the Summer Bailout tour with Emery, Maylene and the Sons of Disaster, Closure in Moscow and Secret & Whisper, then finished out the year on the Vans Warped Tour.They also filmed their music video Instincts and was picked up by Outerloop management under the care of Anthony "Yogi" Allgood.

During July & August of this year they toured alongside Dance Gavin Dance, Silverstein, and Emery on the Scream it Like You Mean It Tour that is actually owned by said manager.  Ivoryline was a part of Creation Fest the Tour 2010 with Thousand Foot Krutch and Disciple.

The band's latest album, titled Vessels and was released July 27, 2010.

The band has currently been dropped from the Tooth and Nail label.

The most recent indication that there may be new Ivoryline material in the works was on June 30, 2014 when Wes Hart posted on Facebook that he had started working at a studio and wanted to make plans to record a new Ivoryline album. No update has been given since then, and posts on the band's social media pages have been minimal.

Members
Current
 Jeremy Gray – lead vocals
 Dusty Kittle – guitar
 Wes Hart – drums
 Shane Rivette - bass
 Brandon Crabtree - touring guitar
Former
 Robert Woodward – bass guitar
 Scott Socia – guitar
 Michael Bethancourt – guitar, synthesizer
 Eric Meeks – drums

Discography

As Dead End Driveway
 2003: Better Luck Next Year
 2004: The Illusion Is Fading

As Ivoryline

Albums

Singles

Music videos

References

External links

Official Myspace
Official Purevolume
Review on Germany´s Punk76.com

Alternative rock groups from Texas
American post-hardcore musical groups
Christian rock groups from Texas
Musical groups established in 2003